Spilinga is a comune (municipality) in the Province of Vibo Valentia in the Italian region Calabria, located about  southwest of Catanzaro and about  west of Vibo Valentia.

The municipality of Spilinga contains the frazioni (subdivisions, mainly villages and hamlets) Panaìa and Monte Poro.

Spilinga borders the following municipalities: Drapia, Joppolo, Limbadi, Nicotera, Ricadi, Rombiolo, Zungri.

Points of interest

Madonna delle Fonti
The Sanctuary of Madonna della Fontana is set in an ancient hermit cave near the town. The cult of Madonna of the Fountain begins in the early 1900s. The little church was built in 1920 in the same place where, as local people say, a woman found a statue of a Virgin Lady by following instructions she received in a dream.

Other points of interest 
 Church of San Giovanni Battista: built in 1645
 Church of Carciadi: set in the higher point of the town
 Rural aqueduct: about four miles from the town, on the road to Vibo Valentia. Its structure recalls an ancient Roman aqueduct 
 Hermits caves: in medieval times, hermits chose these natural caves in the neighborhood of Spilinga as a place to take shelter and pray.
 Ruffa Valley: crossed by the torrent Ruffa. Very interesting for its variety of fauna and flora (among other things, a rare species of fern, Woodwardia radicans). Along the valley there are many old mills, that were an important economic resource till the 1950s.
 Spilinga is the home of 'Nduja, a spicy pork paté.

Demographic evolution

References

Cities and towns in Calabria